Ney Nogueira (21 July 1936 – 2017) was a Brazilian water polo player. He competed in the men's tournament at the 1964 Summer Olympics.

References

External links
 

1936 births
2017 deaths
Brazilian male water polo players
Olympic water polo players of Brazil
Water polo players at the 1964 Summer Olympics
Water polo players from Rio de Janeiro (city)
20th-century Brazilian people